The Ministry of National Development Planning/National Development Planning Agency  (abbreviated PPN/Bappenas) is a ministry of the Republic of Indonesia that has the task to oversee government affairs in the field of national development planning to assist the President in organizing state government. The minister is responsible to the President. The Ministry of National Development Planning uses organizational units and resources within the National Development Planning Agency.

The current Minister for National Development Planning, which is ex officio also the Head of the National Development Planning Agency, is Suharso Monoarfa, appointed by President Joko Widodo on 23 October 2019.

History
After independence of Indonesia, the Planning Board was established on 12 April 1947. The board formulated Indonesia's first development planning document, called the Dasar-dasar Pokok Daripada Plan Mengatur Ekonomi Indonesia (Basic Plan for Developing Indonesia's Economy). On 7 January 1952, it became the Badan Perancang Negara (State Development Agency), which formulated Indonesia's first 5-year plan, namely the development plan for 1956–1960. The term Bappenas originated from Presidential Decree Number 12 of 1963, which integrated the Depernas into the working cabinet. Functions of Bappenas is guided by Law No. 25 of 2004 and the Long-Term National Development Planning Law No. 17 of 2007.

Functions
The Ministry of National Development Planning organizes functions:
 Formulation and determination of policies in the field of national development planning, national development strategies, sectoral, cross-sectoral and cross-regional policy directions, as well as macroeconomic framework that includes a comprehensive picture of the economy including fiscal policy direction, regulatory framework, institutions, and funding;
 Coordination and synchronization of policy implementation in the field of national development planning and budgeting;
 Fostering and providing administrative support to all elements of the organization within the Ministry of National Development Planning;
 Management of state property / assets that are the responsibility of the Ministry of National Development Planning; and
 Oversight of the implementation of tasks within the Ministry of National Development Planning.

Organizational structure 
Based on Presidential Regulation Number 80 of 2021, the organizational structure of the Ministry of State Development Planning is:
 Office of the Minister of National Development Planning (concurrent post with Chief of National Development Planning Agency)
Office of the Deputy Minister of National Development Planning (concurrent post with Vice Chief of National Development Planning Agency)
Ministry Secretariat
Office of the Ministerial Secretary of the Ministry of National Development Planning (concurrent post with Main Secretary of National Development Planning Agency) 
Expert Staff of Development Equity and Territorial Affairs
Expert Staff of Social Affairs and Poverty Countermeasure 
Expert Staff of Development of Leading Sectors and Infrastructures.
Expert Staff of Institutional Relationship
Expert Staff of Economy Synergize and Funding
Based on Presidential Regulation Number 81 of 2021, the organizational structure of the National Development Planning Agency is:
 Office of the Chief of National Development Planning Agency
Office of the Vice Chief of National Development Planning Agency
Main Secretariat
Office of Main Secretary of National Development Planning Agency
Bureau of Public Relations, Archives, and Leadership Administration
Bureau of Human Resources
Bureau of Legal Affairs
Bureau of Planning, Organization, and Procedures
Bureau of General Affairs 
Deputy for Economic Affairs (Deputy I)
Directorate of Macroeconomy Planning and Statistical Analysis
Directorate of State Finance and Monetary Analysis
Directorate of Financial Services and State-owned Enterprises
Directorate of Trade, Investment, and International Trading Cooperation
Directorate of Industry, Tourism, and Creative Economy
Deputy for Regional Development (Deputy II)
Directorate of Spatial Planning, Agrarian Affairs, and Disaster Management
Directorate of Regional Development
Directorate of Regional 1 (Sumatera, Jawa, and Bali Regions)
Directorate of Regional 2 (Kalimantan, Sulawesi, and West Nusa Tenggara Regions)
Directorate of Regional 3 (East Nusa Tenggara, North Maluku, Maluku, and Papua Regions)
Deputy for Maritime Affairs and Natural Resources (Deputy III)
Directorate of Food and Agriculture
Directorate of Forestry and Water Resource Conservation
Directorate of Marine Affairs and Fishery
Directorate of Energy, Minerals, and Mining Resources
Directorate of Environment
Deputy for Facilities and Infrastructure (Deputy IV)
Directorate of Water Resources
Directorate of Transportation
Directorate of Electricity, Telecommunication, and Informatics
Directorate of Planning and Development of National Priority Infrastructure Projects
Directorate of Housing and Settlements
Deputy for Population and Manpower Affairs (Deputy V)
Directorate of Population and Social Security
Directorate of Manpower
Directorate of Poverty Countermeasures and Public Empowerment
Directorate of Development of Micro, Small, Medium Businesses, and Cooperation 
Deputy for Development of Human, Society, and Cultural Affairs (Deputy VI)
Directorate of Health and Public Nutrition
Directorate of Religion, Education and Culture
Directorate of Higher Education, Science, and Technology
Directorate of Family, Women, Children, Youth, and Sports  
Deputy for Politics, Law, Defense, and Security (Deputy VII)
Directorate of Politics and Communication
Directorate of State Apparatuses and Bureaucracy Transformation
Directorate of Foreign Politics and International Development Cooperation
Directorate of Defense and Security
Deputy for Funding of Development (Deputy VIII)
Directorate of Planning for Funding of Development
Directorate of Funding of Development Allocation
Directorate of Bilateral Funding
Directorate of Multilateral Funding
Directorate of Development for Funding of Development
Deputy for Monitoring, Evaluation, and Control of Development (Deputy IX)
Directorate of System and Procedure for Monitoring, Evaluation, and Control of Development
Directorate of Monitoring, Evaluation, and Control for Sectoral Development
Directorate of Monitoring, Evaluation, and Control for Regional Development
Directorate of Evaluation and Control of Development Planning Formulation
Main Inspectorate
General Administration Affairs Inspectorate
Institutional Performance Inspectorate
Inspectorate Administration Office
Centers
Center for Planners Guidance, Education, and Training
Center for Data and Information of Development Planning
Center for Policy and Performance Analysis 
Aside of these offices, the ministry also possessed several agencies under the ministry coordination:

 Geospatial Information Agency
 National Procurement Board

See also
 Administrative divisions of Indonesia
 Indonesia Vision 2045

References

Bibliography

Mustopadidjaja AR et al. 2012.  Bappenas dalam Sejarah Perencanaan Pembangunan Indonesia 1945-2025 [Bappenas in the History of Development Planning in Indonesia]. Jakarta: LP3ES. 

BAPPENAS
Government of Indonesia